Douglas Kennedy (born January 1, 1955) is an American novelist. He is known for international bestsellers The Big Picture, The Pursuit of Happiness, Leaving the World and The Moment.

Biography
Douglas Kennedy was born in New York City in 1955, the son of a commodities broker and a production assistant at NBC. He was educated at The Collegiate School and graduated with a B.A. magna cum laude from Bowdoin College in 1976. He also spent a year studying at Trinity College Dublin. "I was a history major," Kennedy explained. "Retrospectively, I think the history major provides much better training for a novelist. So much of what I do in my own fiction is observational; is looking at behavior. By studying human history you really see how human folly endlessly repeats itself. In my work—in whatever form it takes—I am very much grappling with what it means to be American in this way." 

Kennedy married Grace Patricia Carley in 20 April 1985. He has two children, Max and Amelia. The couple divorced in 2009. In 2012, Kennedy married Christine Ury. They divorced in 2017.

Career 
In 1977, he returned to Dublin and started a co-operative theatre company with a friend. He was later hired to run the Abbey Theatre's second house, The Peacock. He also co-produced the 1983 Irish drama film Attracta starring Wendy Hiller. At the age of 28, he resigned from The Peacock to write full-time. After several radio plays for the BBC and one stage play, he decided to switch directions and wrote his first book, a narrative account of his travels in Egypt called Beyond the Pyramids, which was published in 1988. Kennedy and his then-wife moved to London that year, where Kennedy expanded his journalistic work, and wrote for The Sunday Times, The Sunday Telegraph, The Listener, the New Statesman, Le Monde, and the British editions of Esquire and GQ.

Kennedy is the author of seventeen novels, including the international bestsellers The Big Picture, The Pursuit of Happiness, Leaving the World and The Moment.  He is also the author of three highly praised travel books.

More than 14 million copies of his books have been sold worldwide and his work has been translated into twenty-two languages.  Kennedy's novels are often written in European landscapes, and have been particularly acclaimed and beloved in France; his novel, Five Days, published by Atria in April 2013 and by Belfond in October 2013, became a #1 Bestseller in France, as did his earlier novels, The Moment and Leaving the World.  Kennedy received the French decoration Chevalier de l'Ordre des Arts et des Lettres in 2007. In November 2009, he received the first “Grand Prix du Figaro,” awarded by the newspaper Le Figaro.

After it was published in 2017 in France, "The Great Wide Open" was published in the US and the UK in 2019. Kennedy's last novel, "Afraid Of The Light" was published by Penguin Random House in July 2021. Kennedy has also written three children's books in collaboration with french illustrator Joann Sfar. The series of children's books are entitled "Les fabuleuses aventures d'Aurore" and depict the life of young girl with low verbal autism. 

In 2022, Kennedy was invited by President Macron of France to accompany him on his official state visit to Washington DC and New Orleans, including the opening ceremony at The White House and a State Department luncheon hosted by Vice President Harris and Secretary of State Antony Blinken.

Works

Non-fiction
Beyond the Pyramids: Travels in Egypt (1988)
In God's Country: Travels in the Bible Belt (1989)
Chasing Mammon: Travels in the Pursuit of Money (1992)

Novels
The Dead Heart (1994)
The Big Picture (1997)
The Job (1998)
The Pursuit of Happiness (2001)
A Special Relationship (2003)
State of the Union (2005)
Temptation aka Losing It (2006)
The Woman in the Fifth (2007)
Leaving the World (2010)
The Moment (2011)
Five Days (2013)
The Heat of Betrayal (2015) aka "The Blue Hour"
The Pick-Up and Hit and Run/Drôle de Drague et Délit de Fuite (2016)
La symphonie du hasard (2017) aka "The Great Wide Open"
The Great Wide Open (2019)
Isabelle in the Afternoon (2020)
Afraid Of The Light (2021)

Children's Literature
Les fabuleuses aventures d'Aurore (2019)
Aurore et le mystère de la chambre secrète (2020)
Aurore et l'incroyable énigme de New York (2022)

Films
The Dead Heart was the basis of the 1997 film Welcome to Woop Woop. Kennedy's second novel, The Big Picture, a New York Times Bestseller, was a dark exploration of identity and self-entrapment set in Connecticut's suburbs. It was adapted as a French film (L'Homme qui voulait vivre sa vie) and released in theaters in 2010, starring Romain Duris and Catherine Deneuve.

The Woman in the Fifth, the story of a beleaguered professor who falls in love with a strange woman who isn't the person she seems, was also adapted into film, and was released in November 2011, starring Ethan Hawke and Kristin Scott Thomas.

Critical reception 
Being one of the best-selling novelists, Douglas Kennedy is widely known as "a master storyteller with a trademark genius for writing serious popular fiction." His books have received positive reviews. His first novel, The Dead Heart' was reviewed by Jason Cowley from The Independent and said, "This book is constantly capable of amusing us." According to Publishers Weekly review of his best selling book The Pursuit of Happiness', "Kennedy tells his epic tale with a keen eye and brisk pace, confidently sweeping through historic events." Liadan Hynes from Irish Independent reviewed the book The Heat of Betrayal and said, "Douglas Kennedy manages to maintain a gripping pace and it's enjoyable for the reader." According to The Independent review of his book Leaving the World, "Kennedy keeps us wanting to know what happens next. We can call this book manipulative, but this is exactly what we pay him to do." Publishers Weekly in their review of Kennedy's bestseller book The Big Picture said, "There is a lot of excitement in the air about this novel, and it is thoroughly justified."

References

External links

 Douglas Kennedy - Official Author Website
 Douglas Kennedy's top 10 books about grief The Guardian
 Douglas Kennedy: The Moment That Changed Me. A Man Had a Heart Attack And Died In My Arms The Guardian 
 This Much I Know: Douglas Kennedy 
 Douglas Kennedy: my five best books 
 Write Now with Douglas Kennedy 
 La era de la incertidumbre 
 Douglas Kennedy's 'Five Days' 
 Author Interview: Bestselling Novelist Douglas Kennedy Talks About “Five Days” 
 Masterclass "Les secrets d'écriture de Douglas Kennedy" 
 Shelf Analysis - Episode 16 - Douglas Kennedy 
 Douglas Kennedy

American atheists
20th-century American novelists
21st-century American novelists
American travel writers
Bowdoin College alumni
Collegiate School (New York) alumni
American expatriates in the United Kingdom
Naturalised citizens of Ireland
Living people
1955 births
American male novelists
20th-century American male writers
21st-century American male writers
Novelists from New York (state)
20th-century American non-fiction writers
21st-century American non-fiction writers
American male non-fiction writers